Schottel (company), German manufacturer of ship propulsion

Schottel or Schöttel is a German surname. Notable people with the surname include:

Ivan Schottel, United States football coach
Justus Georg Schottel, Baroque German grammarian
Peter Schöttel, Austrian football player

See also
Vinzenz Schöttl (1905–1946), German Nazi leader in the KZ Monowitz

German-language surnames